The 2012 Tour de Wallonie was the 39th edition of the Tour de Wallonie cycle race and was held on 21–25 July 2012. The race started in Tournai and finished in Perwez. The race was won by Giacomo Nizzolo.

General classification

References

Tour de Wallonie
Tour de Wallonie